Almeda is an area of Cornellà de Llobregat (Catalonia, Spain), in the metropolitan area of Barcelona. It was constructed in front of Parc de Can Mercader. The neighbourhood originated during the Industrial Revolution and grew substantially with the settlement of migrant workers from other areas of the country during the 1950s. Some of Cornellà's most important companies are located there. Its main business estates are Fira de Cornellà, WTC Almeda Park and the local branch of El Corte Inglés. Almeda has had a railway station since 1912, even though the current one was built in 1985. It is integrated in the Barcelona Metro network as part of line L8.

See also
Mercader Palace Museum

References

Cornellà de Llobregat